The George Enescu National University of Arts is a public university in Iași, Romania, founded in 1860. It was named in honor of the composer George Enescu.

History
The institution was established on 1 October 1860, as the Music and Declamation School, by decree of Prince Alexandru Ioan Cuza, followed 26 days later, by the foundation of the School for Sculpture and Painting. In October 1864, Cuza approved the Charter for the Music and Declamation Conservatory and the Charter for the National Schools of Fine Arts (establishing the departments of painting, sculpture, gravure, architecture and the art of landscape architecture).

In 1931, the Conservatory and the School of Fine Arts became the Academy of Music and Dramatic Art of Iași, which soon adopted the name George Enescu, and the Iași Academy of Fine Arts, respectively.

After World War II, under the communist regime, the two academies were integrated as the George Enescu Conservatory. Having reverted to the name George Enescu Academy of Art, the institution was regrouped, in 1992, to focus on visual arts, theatre, and music. In 1997, its current name, George Enescu University of Arts, was adopted.

Structure
Faculties
 Faculty of Music Performance, Composition, and Music Studies
 Theatre Faculty 
 Faculty of Visual Arts and Design

Professors and alumni

Călin Alupi
Corneliu Baba
Gheorghe Panaiteanu Bardasare
Octav Băncilă
Anda-Louise Bogza
Ștefan Ciubotărașu
Hariclea Darclée
Ștefan Dimitrescu
Petre Hârtopeanu
Ion Irimescu
Ernest Maftei

Ion Mateescu
Nelly Miricioiu
Mihai Nechita
Camil Ressu
Constantin Daniel Stahi
Nicolae Tonitza
Tudor Zbârnea

See also

Iași "Moldova" Philharmonic Orchestra
Iași Romanian National Opera

References

External links

Official website
Balș House at arhitectura-1906.ro

Art schools in Romania
Romanian culture
Educational institutions established in 1860
George Enescu National University of Arts
Culture in Iași
Arts organizations established in the 1860s
1860 establishments in Romania